Elizabeth Sworowski née Ellis (born 12 March 1961 in Sheffield, West Riding of Yorkshire) is an English retired female race walker.

Athletics career
Sworowski competed for Great Britain at the 1992 Summer Olympics. She set her personal best (45.59 minutes) in the 10 km race in 1991. She represented England in the 10 km walk event, at the 1990 Commonwealth Games in Auckland, New Zealand.

International competitions

National titles
AAA Championships 5000 metres (1988, 1989, 1990, 1991)
AAA Championships 10,000 metres (1988, 1989 (tied), 1991)
UK Championships 5000 metres (1988, 1990)

References

 sports-reference

1961 births
Living people
Sportspeople from Sheffield
British female racewalkers
English female racewalkers
Olympic athletes of Great Britain
Athletes (track and field) at the 1990 Commonwealth Games
Athletes (track and field) at the 1992 Summer Olympics
World Athletics Championships athletes for Great Britain
Commonwealth Games competitors for England